The 1954 California gubernatorial election was held on November 2, 1954. Incumbent Republican governor Goodwin Knight, who had ascended to the office after Earl Warren resigned to become Chief Justice of the United States the previous year, won the election to serve his sole term as Governor of California.

Knight remains the last Republican gubernatorial candidate as of 2022 to carry San Francisco.

General election results

Results by county
Knight is the last Republican gubernatorial nominee to have won San Francisco County.

References
 Our Campaigns

Gubernatorial
California
1954
November 1954 events in the United States